The McDuffie County School District is a public school district in McDuffie County, Georgia, United States, based in Thomson. It serves the communities of Dearing and Thomson.

Schools
The McDuffie County School District has four elementary schools, one middle schools, and one high school.

Elementary schools
Dearing Elementary School
Maxwell Elementary School
Norris Elementary School
Thomson Elementary School

Middle schools
Thomson-McDuffie Middle School

High school
Thomson High School

References

External links

School districts in Georgia (U.S. state)
Education in McDuffie County, Georgia